Kenkiidae is a family of freshwater triclads. Their species can be found sporadically in caves, groundwater, and deep lakes in Central Asia, Far East and North America.

Description 
Species in the family Kenkiidae are characterized by a thickened marginal epidermis, i.e., the epidermis of the body margins have larger cells provided with bigger rhabdites than the epidermis of the rest of the body. Kenkiidae species have the testicles situated anterior to the pharynx, feature also common in the Dugesiidae and Planariidae. They have an anterior adhesive organ, which is also found in the family Dendrocoelidae. The inner muscles of the pharynx are divided in two layers. Kenkiidae species are not pigmented and they are usually blind.

Phylogeny 
Kenkiidae is the sister group of the family Dendrocoelidae. Both families have an apomorphic anterior adhesive organ.

Phylogenetic supertree after Sluys et al., 2009:

References

External links 

Continenticola
Platyhelminthes families